Imetang is a village in Ngarchelong, Palau. It falls into the definition of a linear settlement as it is based along a roughly linear road, although it is not entirely straight. It contains the Ngarchelong Evangelical Church, the sole church in Ngarchelong.

References 

Populated places in Palau